Edward "Eddie" Dunbar (born 1 September 1996) is an Irish road racing cyclist, who rides for UCI WorldTeam .

Career

Team Sky (2018–22)
Born in Banteer, Dunbar joined  in September 2018, after his previous team  – whom he had joined at the start of 2018 – encountered financial issues, and with approval from the Union Cycliste Internationale (UCI), agreed to an early release from his contract. In May 2019, he was named in the startlist for the 2019 Giro d'Italia and came third in Stage 12 of the race.

Team BikeExchange–Jayco
In August 2022, it was announced that Dunbar was to join  from the 2023 season, on a three-year contract.

Career achievements

Major results
Source: 

2013
 1st  Time trial, National Junior Road Championships
 5th Overall Junior Tour of Wales
2014
 National Junior Road Championships
1st  Road race
3rd Time trial
 1st  Overall Junior Tour of Wales
1st Stages 2 & 5
 1st  Overall Trofeo Karlsberg
 2nd Shay Elliott Memorial Race
2015
 National Road Championships
1st  Under-23 road race
2nd Time trial
2nd Road race
2nd Under-23 time trial
 4th Overall Tour of the Reservoir
 9th Time trial, UEC European Under-23 Road Championships
2016
 National Road Championships
1st  Under-23 time trial
2nd Time trial
 4th Overall An Post Rás
1st Stage 7
 6th Time trial, UEC European Under-23 Road Championships
 9th Time trial, UCI Under-23 Road World Championships
2017
 1st Ronde van Vlaanderen Beloften
 2nd Overall Le Triptyque des Monts et Châteaux
 3rd Time trial, National Under-23 Road Championships
 3rd Trofeo Città di San Vendemiano
 5th Overall Volta ao Alentejo
 5th Clássica da Arrábida
 6th Gran Premio Palio del Recioto
2018
 4th Overall Tour of Belgium
 5th Volta Limburg Classic
 8th Overall Tour de Yorkshire
 8th Overall Tour de l'Avenir
 8th Memorial Marco Pantani
2019
 National Road Championships
2nd Road race
2nd Time trial
 3rd Overall Tour de Yorkshire
 5th Overall Route d'Occitanie
 6th Overall Tour de Wallonie
 6th Giro della Toscana
 7th Overall Tour de la Provence
2020
 4th Giro dell'Emilia
 6th Overall Tour de la Provence
2021
 1st  Young rider classification, Tour de Suisse
 9th GP Industria & Artigianato di Larciano
2022
 1st  Overall Settimana Internazionale di Coppi e Bartali
 1st  Overall Tour de Hongrie
 3rd Time trial, National Road Championships

Grand Tour general classification results timeline

Awards
In 2014, Dunbar was named as the Irish Male Cyclist of the Year.

References

External links

 
 
 
 
 
 

1996 births
Living people
Irish male cyclists
Cyclists at the 2015 European Games
European Games competitors for Ireland
Sportspeople from County Cork
Olympic cyclists of Ireland
Cyclists at the 2020 Summer Olympics